Theophilus is a prominent lunar impact crater that lies between Sinus Asperitatis in the north and Mare Nectaris to the southeast. It partially intrudes into the comparably sized crater Cyrillus to the southwest. To the east is the smaller crater Mädler and further to the south-southeast is Beaumont. It was named after the 4th-century Coptic Pope Theophilus I of Alexandria.

Theophilus, Cyrillus and Catharina form a prominent group of large craters visible on the terminator 5 days after the new moon.

Description
The rim of Theophilus has a wide, terraced inner surface that shows indications of landslips. It is 4200 metres deep with massive walls and has broken into a second formation, Cyrillus. It was created during the Eratosthenian period, from 3.2 to 1.1 billion years ago. It has an imposing central mountain, 1,400 metres high, with four summits.

The floor of the crater is relatively flat, and it has a large, triple-peaked central mountain that climbs to a height of about 2 kilometres above the floor. The western peak is designated Psi (ψ), the eastern Phi (φ), and the northern peak is Alpha (α) Theophilus. The western slopes of this ridge are wider and more irregular, whereas the peaks descend more sharply to the floor on the northern and western faces.

The Apollo 16 mission collected several pieces of basalt that are believed to be ejecta from the formation of Theophilus.

Satellite craters
By convention these features are identified on lunar maps by placing the letter on the side of the crater midpoint that is closest to Theophilus.

External links
 
 Central Peak Bedrock, from LROC

References

Impact craters on the Moon
Eratosthenian